"Escape" is Misia's 6th single. It was released on her birthday, 7 July 2000. It peaked at #7 selling 81,130 copies on its first week. It was used in a commercial for Kenwood's "Avino".

Track list

Charts

External links
https://web.archive.org/web/20061117164950/http://www.rhythmedia.co.jp/misia/disc/ — Misia Discography

2000 singles
Misia songs
Songs written by Misia
2000 songs